The 2011–12 Copa Federación de España is the 19th staging of the Copa Federación de España, a knockout competition for Spanish football clubs in Segunda División B and Tercera División.

The competition began on 3 August 2011 and ended with the finals on 12 April and 19 April 2012, where Binissalem became champion after defeating Lemona on away goals after a 6–6 aggregate.

Autonomous Communities tournaments

Andalusia tournament

Final

|}

Aragon tournament

First round

|}

Semifinals

|}

Final

|}

Asturias tournament

Qualifying tournament

Group A

Group B

Group C

Group D

Semifinals

|}

Final

|}

Balearic Islands tournament

Semifinals

|}

Final

|}

Canary Islands tournament

Final

|}

Cantabria tournament

First round

|}

Semifinals

|}

Final

|}

Castile and León tournament

Finals

Castile-La Mancha tournament

Semifinals

|}

Final

|}

Catalonia tournament

Final

|}

Euskadi tournament

Finals

Extremadura tournament

First round

|}

Semifinal

|}

Final

|}

Galicia tournament

First round

|}

Semifinals

|}

Final

|}

La Rioja tournament

Semifinals

|}

Final

|}

Madrid tournament

Qualifying tournament

Group 1

Group 2

Final

|}

Murcia tournament

Qualifying tournament

Group A

Group B

Group C

|}

Group D

|}

Semifinals

|}

Final

|}

Navarre tournament

Semifinals

|}

Final

|}

Valencia tournament

First round

|}

Semifinals

|}

Final

|}

National tournament

National Qualifying round

|}

Round of 32

|}

Round of 16

|}

Quarterfinals

|}

Semifinals

|}

Final

|}

Notes

2011-12
2011–12 Tercera División
2011–12 Segunda División B
3